The People's Party of Switzerland may refer to:

 Swiss People's Party, a current national conservative political party
 Volkspartei der Schweiz, a defunct neo-Nazi political party